Talang 2020 is the tenth season of Swedish Talang and is broadcast on TV4 between 10 January - 13 March 2020. Presenters for this season are Pär Lernström and Samir Badran, the jury consists of Alexander Bard, David Batra, Bianca Ingrosso and LaGaylia Frazier.

Because of the spread of the coronavirus, the final on 13 March was held without an audience.

References

Talang (Swedish TV series)
2020 Swedish television seasons
2020 in Swedish television